Octopus 2: River of Fear is a 2001 action-horror sequel to Octopus.   It was directed by Yossi Wein and produced by Boaz Davidson. Davidson also wrote the film's screenplay.

Plot
Dead bodies are being found in the New York Harbor. The police have no clues nor suspects until Nick and his partner realize the killer is a giant octopus. Nick confronts the octopus and wrestles it as it try to eat another victim. Nick fails and the victim is eaten. Spedders heads back to the harbor to kill the octopus. Initially, he thinks he blows up the octopus. He proceeds to rescue a bus full of children with Rachel. The octopus returns but is killed by Nick Spedding and another officer before it can attack again.

Cast
Michael Reilly Burke as Nick Hartfield
 Meredith Morton as Rachel Starbird
Fredric Lehne as Walter
 John Thaddeus as Tony
Chris Williams as Payton / X-Ray
Stoyan Angelov as X-Ray
 Paul Vincent O'Connor as Capt. Hensley
 Clement Blake as Mad Dog
Duncan Fraser as Mayor
 Violeta Markovska as Anna Lee
 Shane Edelman as Mayor's Aide
 Harry Anichkin as Judge
 Velizar Binev as Hotel Manager

Reception
Hell Horror said that the film "is an American horror movie that was an utter waste of my time."

See also 
 List of killer octopus films

References

External links 
 

2001 films
2001 horror films
American natural horror films
Films about cephalopods
Giant monster films
Films directed by Yossi Wein
2000s English-language films
Films produced by Boaz Davidson
Films set in New York City
Films with screenplays by Boaz Davidson
2000s American films